Łukówiec  is a village in Gmina Firlej, Lubartów County, Lublin Voivodeship, Poland.

References

Villages in Lubartów County